Partial Bible translations into languages of the English people can be traced back to the late 7th century, including translations into Old and Middle English. More than 100 complete translations into English have been written.

Old English 

The Bible in its entirety was not translated into English until the Middle English period, with John Wycliffe's translation in 1382. In the centuries before this, however, many had translated large portions of the Bible into English. Parts of the Bible were first translated from the Latin Vulgate into Old English by a few monks and scholars. Such translations were generally in the form of prose or as interlinear glosses (literal translations above the Latin words).

Very few complete translations existed during that time. Most of the books of the Bible existed separately and were read as individual texts.  Translations of the Bible often included the writer's own commentary on passages in addition to the literal translation.

Aldhelm, Bishop of Sherborne and Abbot of Malmesbury (639–709), is thought to have written an Old English translation of the Psalms.

Bede (c. 672–735) produced a translation of the Gospel of John into Old English, which he is said to have prepared shortly before his death.  This translation is lost; we know of its existence from Cuthbert of Jarrow's account of Bede's death.

In the 10th century an Old English translation of the Gospels was made in the Lindisfarne Gospels: a word-for-word gloss inserted between the lines of the Latin text by Aldred, Provost of Chester-le-Street. This is the oldest extant translation of the Gospels into the English language.

The Wessex Gospels (also known as the West-Saxon Gospels) are a full translation of the four gospels into a West Saxon dialect of Old English. Produced in approximately 990, they are the first translation of all four gospels into English without the Latin text.

In the 11th century, Abbot Ælfric translated much of the Old Testament into Old English. The Old English Hexateuch is an illuminated manuscript of the first six books of the Old Testament (the Hexateuch).

Middle English 

The Ormulum is in Middle English of the 12th century. Like its Old English precursor from Ælfric, an abbot of Eynsham, it includes very little Biblical text, and focuses more on personal commentary. This style was adopted by many of the original English translators. For example, the story of the Wedding at Cana is almost 800 lines long, but fewer than 40 lines are in the actual translation of the text. An unusual characteristic is that the translation mimics Latin verse, and so is similar to the better known and appreciated 14th-century English poem Cursor Mundi.

Richard Rolle (1290–1349) wrote an English Psalter. Many religious works are attributed to Rolle, but it has been questioned how many are genuinely from his hand. Many of his works were concerned with personal devotion, and some were used by the Lollards.

Theologian John Wycliffe (c. 1320s–1384) is credited with translating what is now known as Wycliffe's Bible, though it is not clear how much of the translation he himself did. This translation came out in two different versions. The earlier text is characterised by a strong adherence to the word order of Latin, and might have been difficult for the layperson to comprehend. The later text made more concessions to the native grammar of English.

Early Modern and Modern English

Early Modern English 
Early Modern English Bible translations are of between about 1500 and 1800, the period of Early Modern English. This was the first major period of Bible translation into the English language.

This period began with the introduction of the Tyndale Bible. The first complete edition of his New Testament was in 1526. William Tyndale used the Greek and Hebrew texts of the New Testament (NT) and Old Testament (OT) in addition to Jerome's Latin translation. He was the first translator to use the printing press – this enabled the distribution of several thousand copies of his New Testament translation throughout England. Tyndale did not complete his Old Testament translation.

The first printed English translation of the whole Bible was produced by Miles Coverdale in 1535, using Tyndale's work together with his own translations from the Latin Vulgate or German text. After much scholarly debate it is concluded that this was printed in Antwerp and the colophon gives the date as 4 October 1535. This first edition was adapted by Coverdale for his first "authorised version", known as the Great Bible, of 1539. 

Other early printed versions were the Geneva Bible (1560), notable for being the first Bible divided into verses and which negated the Divine Right of Kings; the Bishop's Bible (1568), which was an attempt by Elizabeth I to create a new authorised version; and the Authorized King James Version of 1611.

The first complete Catholic Bible in English was the Douay–Rheims Bible, of which the New Testament portion was published in Rheims in 1582 and the Old Testament somewhat later in Douay in Gallicant Flanders. The Old Testament was completed by the time the New Testament was published but, due to extenuating circumstances and financial issues, it was not published until nearly three decades later, in two editions: the first released in 1609, and the rest of the OT in 1610. In this version, the seven deuterocanonical books are amongst the other books, as in the Latin Vulgate, rather than kept separate in an appendix.

Modern English 
While early English Bibles were generally based on a small number of Greek texts, or on Latin translations, modern English translations of the Bible are based on a wider variety of manuscripts in the original languages, mostly Greek and Hebrew.  

The translators put much scholarly effort into cross-checking the various sources such as the Septuagint, Textus Receptus, and Masoretic Text.  Relatively recent discoveries such as the Dead Sea scrolls provide additional reference information. Some controversy has existed over which texts should be used as a basis for translation, as some of the alternate sources do not include phrases (or sometimes entire verses) which are found only in the Textus Receptus.

Some say the alternate sources were poorly representative of the texts used in their time, whereas others claim the Textus Receptus includes passages that were added to the alternate texts improperly.  These controversial passages are not the basis for disputed issues of doctrine: they tend to be additional stories or snippets of phrases. Many modern English translations, such as the New International Version, contain limited text notes indicating where differences occur in original sources.

A somewhat greater number of textual differences are noted in the New King James Bible, indicating hundreds of New Testament differences between the Nestle-Aland, the Textus Receptus, and the Hodges edition of the Majority Text.  The differences in the Old Testament are less well documented, but they do contain some references to differences between consonantal interpretations in the Masoretic Text, the Dead Sea Scrolls, and the Septuagint.  Even with these hundreds of differences, however, a more complete listing is beyond the scope of most single-volume Bibles.

Individual translations 

While most Bible translations are made by committees of scholars in order to avoid bias or idiosyncrasy, translations are sometimes made by individuals. The following, selected translations are largely the work of individual translators:
  Noah Webster's Bible Translation (1833), 
  Young's Literal Translation (1862), 
  Emphatic Diaglott by Benjamin Wilson (1864), 
  Julia E. Smith Parker Translation (1876), "Translated Literally", 
 J.N. Darby's Darby Bible (1890), 
  Modern Reader's Bible (1914) by Richard Moulton, 
  Five Pauline Epistles, New Translation (1900) by William Gunion Rutherford, 
  Bryant Rotherham's Emphasized Bible (1902), 
  S. H. Hooke's The Bible in Basic English (1949), 
 R.A. Knox (1950), 
 J.B. Phillips (1958), 
  Verkuyl's Berkeley Version (1959), 
  Holy Name Bible containing the Holy Name Version of the Old and New Testaments (1963) by Angelo Traina, 
 The Living Bible (1971) by Kenneth N. Taylor, 
 The Bible in Living English (1972) by Stephen T. Byington,
  Jay P. Green's Literal Translation (1985), 
 Heinz Cassirer's translation (1989),
  The Complete Jewish Bible (1998) by Dr. David H. Stern,
  American King James Version (1999) by Michael Engelbrite, 
 Eugene H. Peterson's The Message (2002),
  The Original Aramaic Bible in Plain English (2010) by David Bauscher,
  Father Nicholas King's translation of the Greek Bible into English.
  The Hebrew Bible: A Translation with Commentary, by Robert Alter (2019)

Others, such as N. T. Wright, have translated portions of the Bible.

Jewish translations 

Jewish English Bible translations are modern English Bible translations that include the books of the Hebrew Bible (Tanakh) according to the Masoretic Text, and according to the traditional division and order of Torah, Nevi'im, and Ketuvim.

Jewish translations often also reflect traditional Jewish interpretations of the Bible, as opposed to the Christian understanding that is often reflected in non-Jewish translations. For example, Jewish translations translate עלמה ‘almâh in Isaiah 7:14 as young woman, while many Christian translations render the word as virgin.

While modern biblical scholarship is similar for both Christians and Jews, there are distinctive features of Jewish translations, even those created by academic scholars. These include the avoidance of Christological interpretations, adherence to the Masoretic Text (at least in the main body of the text, as in the new Jewish Publication Society (JPS) translation) and greater use of classical Jewish exegesis. Some translations prefer names transliterated from the Hebrew, though the majority of Jewish translations use the Anglicized forms of biblical names.

The first English Jewish translation of the Bible into English was by Isaac Leeser in the 19th century.

The JPS produced two of the most popular Jewish translations, namely the JPS The Holy Scriptures of 1917 and the NJPS Tanakh (first printed in a single volume in 1985, second edition in 1999).

Since the 1980s there have been multiple efforts among Orthodox publishers to produce translations that are not only Jewish, but also adhere to Orthodox norms. Among these are The Living Torah and Nach by Aryeh Kaplan and others, the Torah and other portions in an ongoing project by Everett Fox, and the ArtScroll Tanakh.

Approaches to translation 

Modern translations take different approaches to the rendering of the original languages of approaches. The approaches can usually be considered to be somewhere on a scale between the two extremes:
 Formal equivalence (sometimes called literal translation) in which the greatest effort is made to preserve the meaning of individual words and phrases in the original, with relatively less regard for its understandability by modern readers. Examples include the King James Version, English Standard Version, Literal Standard Version, Revised Standard Version, New Revised Standard Version and New American Standard Bible.
 Dynamic equivalence (or functional equivalence, sometimes paraphrastic translation) in which the translator attempts to render the sense and intent of the original. Examples include The Living Bible and The Message.

Some translations have been motivated by a strong theological distinctive. In the Sacred Name Bibles the conviction that God's name be preserved in a Semitic form is followed.  The Purified Translation of the Bible promotes the idea that Jesus and early Christians drink grape juice not wine. The Jehovah's Witnesses' New World Translation of the Holy Scriptures renders the tetragrammaton as Jehovah throughout the Old Testament, and it uses the form Jehovah in the New Testament including — but not limited to — passages quoting the Old Testament even though it does not appear in the Greek text.

Single source translations 
While most translations attempt to synthesize the various texts in the original languages, some translations also translate one specific textual source, generally for scholarly reasons. A single volume example for the Old Testament is The Dead Sea Scrolls Bible by Martin Abegg, Peter Flint and Eugene Ulrich.

The Comprehensive New Testament by T. E. Clontz and J. Clontz presents a scholarly view of the New Testament text by conforming to the Nestle-Aland 27th edition and extensively annotating the translation to fully explain different textual sources and possible alternative translations.

A Comparative Psalter edited by John Kohlenberger presents a comparative diglot translation of the Psalms of the Masoretic Text and the Septuagint, using the Revised Standard Version and the New English Translation of the Septuagint.

R. A. Knox's Translation of the Vulgate into English is another example of a single source translation.

Alternative approaches 
Most translations make the translators' best attempt at a single rendering of the original, relying on footnotes where there might be alternative translations or textual variants. An alternative is taken by the Amplified Bible. In cases where a word or phrase admits of more than one meaning the Amplified Bible presents all the possible interpretations, allowing the reader to choose one. For example, the first two verses of the Amplified Bible read:
In the beginning God (Elohim) created [by forming from nothing] the heavens and the earth. The earth was formless and void or a waste and emptiness, and darkness was upon the face of the deep [primeval ocean that covered the unformed earth]. The Spirit of God was moving (hovering, brooding) over the face of the waters.

Popularity in USA 
The Evangelical Christian Publishers Association release monthly and annual statistics regarding the popularity of different English Bibles sold by their members in the United States. In 2022, the top five best-selling translations were the following:
 New International Version
 English Standard Version
 New Living Translation
 King James Version
 Christian Standard Bible

Sales are affected by denomination and religious affiliation. For example, the most popular Jewish version would not compete with rankings of a larger audience. Sales data can be affected by the method of marketing. Some translations are directly marketed to particular denominations or local churches, and many Christian booksellers only offer Protestant Bibles, so books in other biblical canons (such as Catholic and Orthodox Bibles) may not appear as high on the CBA rank.

A study published in 2014 by The Center for the Study of Religion and American Culture at Indiana University and Purdue University found that Americans read versions of the Bible as follows:

 King James Version (55%)
 New International Version (19%)
 New Revised Standard Version (7%)
 New American Bible (6%)
 The Living Bible (5%)
 All other translations (8%)

See also 
 List of English Bible translations

References

Further reading 
 Esposito, Raffaele. “Translation of Hebrew in English Bible versions”. Encyclopedia of Hebrew Language and Linguistics. Ed. by Geoffrey Khan. Leiden, Boston: Brill, 2013, vol. 3, pp. 847-850 .
 Daniell, David. The Bible in English: Its History and Influence. Yale University Press, 2003 . 
 
 Fowler, David C. The Bible in Early English Literature. Seattle: University of Washington Press, 1976.
 Grabois, Aryeh. "Bible: Biblical Impact on Daily Life." Dictionary of the Middle Ages. Vol 2. Ed. Joseph R. Strayer. New York: Charles Scribner's Sons, 1983.
 Lawton, David. “Englishing the Bible, 1066-1549.” The Cambridge History of Medieval English Literature. Cambridge: Cambridge UP, 1999, pp. 454-482.
 Levy, Bernard S. Preface. The Bible in the Middle Ages: Its Influence on Literature and Art. Ed. Bernard S. Levy. New York: Medieval & Renaissance Texts & Studies, 1992.
 Maas, A.J.. "Versions of the Bible: English Versions"  The Catholic Encyclopedia. Vol 15. New York: Robert Appleton Company, 1912.
 Paul, William. "Wycliffe, John.” English Language Bible Translators. Jefferson, NC and London: McFarland and Company, 2003, pp. 263-264.
 Muir, Laurence. "Translations and Paraphrases of the Bible and Commentaries." A Manual of the Writings in Middle English: 1050-1500. Ed. J. Burke Severs. Connecticut: The Connecticut Academy of Arts and Sciences, 1970, vol 2, pp. 381–409.
 The New Testament Octapla: Eight English Versions of the New Testament, in the Tyndale-King James Tradition, ed. by Luther A. Weigle. New York: T. Nelson & Sons, 1962. N.B.: The eight English translations of the entire N.T. included (on quarter portions of facing pages) are those of the Bibles in English known as Tyndale's, Great Bible, Geneva Bible, Bishops' Bible, Douay-Rheims (the original Rheims N.T. thereof being included), Great Bible, Authorized "King James", Revised Version, and Revised Standard Version.
 Spencer, Nick. Freedom and Order: History, politics and the English Bible. London: Hodder & Stoughton, 2011.
 Taliaferro, Bradford B. Bible Version Encyclopedia. Lulu Enterprises, 2006-2007.
 Wills, Garry, "A Wild and Indecent Book" (review of David Bentley Hart, The New Testament:  A Translation, Yale University Press, 577 pp.), The New York Review of Books, vol. LXV, no. 2 (8 February 2018), pp. 34–35.  Discusses some pitfalls in interpreting and translating the New Testament.
Kunst, RC. “The Structure of Translation and Hermeneutics” (Oxford Articles 2015).

External links 

 Certified Translation Service
 Great and Manifold: A Celebration of the Bible in English digital collection, Thomas Fisher Rare Book Library, University of Toronto 
 A timeline and chart of various editions and translations of the Bible in GIF
 A collection of links on the Gender-Neutral Bible Controversy, mainly from a perspective opposing Gender-Neutral translations.
 "Why the English Standard Version ?", an article comparing literal and dynamically equivalent translations from a retailer of and with a bias for the English Standard Version
 English Bible History, with links to historic bibles
 modern World English Bible for iPhone and iPad
 
 

 
Biblical criticism